Sandro Cervellini (24 August 1940 – 8 August 2009) was an Italian racing cyclist. He rode in the 1962 Tour de France.

References

1940 births
2009 deaths
Italian male cyclists
Place of birth missing